Daniel Cohen may refer to:

Daniel Cohen (children's writer) (1936–2018), American writer
Daniel Cohen (conductor) (born 1984), General Music Director Staatstheater Darmstadt  
Daniel Cohen (economist) (born 1953), French economist
Daniel Cohen (filmmaker), French actor, screenwriter and director of The Chef
Daniel I. A. Cohen (born 1946), American mathematician and computer scientist
Daniel Cohen, co-founder of the Center for the Study of Human Polymorphisms
Cohen v. Cowles Media Co., for the Republican Dan Cohen
Danny Cohen (cinematographer) (born 1963), British cinematographer
Danny Cohen (computer scientist) (1937–2019), Israeli-American computer scientist
Danny Cohen (television executive) (born 1974), Director of BBC Television
Dan Cohen (politician) (born 1936), American author and politician
Dan Cohen (academic),  American historian and the Founding Executive Director of the Digital Public Library of America
Dan Baron Cohen (born 1957), playwright and community-theatre director
Dan Cohen (journalist) (born 1977), American author, journalist, and blogger
Daniel M. Cohen, American writer, producer, and director
Daniel Morris Cohen, American ichthyologist

See also
Daniel Cohn-Bendit (born 1945), French-German politician
Dan Cohn-Sherbok (born 1945), Reform rabbi